An off-premises extension (OPX),  sometimes also known as off-premises station (OPS), is an extension telephone at a location distant from its servicing exchange.

One type of off-premises extension, connected to a private branch exchange (PBX), is generally used to provide employees with access to a company telephone system while they are out of the office. Off-premises extensions are used in distributed environments, serving locations that are too far from the PBX to be served by on-premises wiring.

Another type of off-premises extension, connected to a public telephone exchange, is generally used to allow a private phone line to ring at a second location. For example, the owner of a business may have an OPX for their home phone at the business location, allowing them to avoid missing calls to the home phone.

Telephone service providers charge a significant monthly rate for an OPX, partly calculated by the distance; in extreme cases, the distance may result in a rate higher than simply having an additional central office line with its own number. Recent innovations such as call forwarding-no answer or simultaneous ringing of multiple lines can replace several of the conveniences of an OPX at much lower cost.

An OPX uses a conditioned wire pair that is usually used only for voice applications, while for data, a pair usually needs to be unconditioned. An alarm circuit is an unconditioned pair.

In Internet telephony, a VoIP VPN OPX may be implemented by connecting an extension over a virtual private networking connection, instead of connecting it directly to the local area network. As a host connected by a VPN appears as a part of the local area network, the off-premises extension appears to the IP-PBX as if it were on-site.

See also
Foreign exchange service (telecommunications)
Hosted PBX

Communication circuits